The 1974 Tour de France was the 61st edition of the Tour de France, one of cycling's Grand Tours. Eddy Merckx was attempting to win his fifth Tour de France in as many races.

In 1974 the tour made its first visit to the United Kingdom, with a circuit stage on the Plympton By-pass, near Plymouth, England.

The race was won by favourite Eddy Merckx, who thus at that point had won all five Tours that he had entered, and had equalled Jacques Anquetil in Tour victories. While he won the race by a comfortable margin, he was not as overwhelmingly dominant as he had been in his previous victories with eight riders finishing within 20:00, two riders within 10:00 and his two top competitors in Luis Ocaña and Joop Zoetemelk absent from the race. Despite other riders finishing closer in the overall standings, Merckx still won an astonishing eight stages. He also won the combination classification. Fellow Belgian Patrick Sercu won the points classification, while Spanish Domingo Perurena won the mountains classification.

Teams

The 1974 Tour de France had 13 teams, with 10 cyclists each.

The teams entering the race were:

 
 
 
 
 
 
 
 La Casera–Peña Bahamontes
 Merlin Plage–Shimano–Flandria

Pre-race favourites

Eddy Merckx, who had been absent in 1973 after winning four Tours in a row, was present again. Merckx had not been as dominant in the spring as in other years; it was his first year as a professional cyclist in which he did not win a spring classic. He did win the 1974 Giro d'Italia and the Tour de Suisse, but after winning the latter he required surgery on the perineum, five days before the 1974 Tour started.

Notable absents were Ocaña and Zoetemelk. Zoetemelk was injured during the Midi Libre and was in hospital with life-threatening meningitis. Between 1970 and 1986 this would be the only Tour Zoetemelk would not start and finish, and would be the only Tour until 1983 that he was not in the top ten.

Ocaña had crashed in the Tour de l'Aude, gone home and was fired by his team for not communicating.

Bernard Thévenet, who was considered a potential winner, had crashed several times in the 1974 Vuelta a España. He did start in the Tour, but was not yet back at his former level.

Route and stages

The 1974 Tour de France started on 27 June, and had two rest days, in Aix-les-Bains and Colomiers.

Race overview

Merckx won the prologue, with his teammate Joseph Bruyère in third place. In the first stage, Bruyère was part of a breakaway, and became the new leader.

The second stage was in Plymouth, the first time that the Tour de France visited England. The riders did not like the experiment, as the British immigration officials made the cyclists wait for a long time when entering the country and again when returning to France.

Merckx collected bonus time in the sprints, and in the fourth stage took back the leading position in the general classification, with Gerben Karstens in second place. Karstens was also doing well in the points classification, and felt Merckx and Patrick Sercu, the leaders in the general and points classification, were helping each other. Karstens was angry and after the finish quickly went away, but forgot that he had to go to the doping control. For this, he was given ten minutes penalty time, and thus he lost his second place in the general classification. Karstens complained to the jury, and other cyclists threatened with a strike, so the jury removed the penalty after the fifth stage. Thanks to bonification seconds in that stage, Karstens took the leading position after that stage.

It was still close in the top of the general classification. Patrick Sercu became the new leader after the first part of the sixth stage, but Karstens regained the lead after the second part of the sixth stage, a team time trial won by Merckx's team, Molteni. Merckx won the seventh stage, and became the next leader.

The Alps were the first serious mountains to be seen, in stage nine. Merckx won the stage, but the surprise of the day was Raymond Poulidor, who at 38 years old was still able to escape during the toughest part of the stage. This also happened in the tenth stage: Poulidor joined the crucial escape, but could not beat Merckx in the final sprint.

In the tenth stage, the hardest Alpine stage, Vicente López Carril from the KAS team stayed away. Merckx was in the next group, together with Francisco Galdós and Gonzalo Aja, also from the KAS team. Aja was in third place in the general classification, so Merckx was unable to chase Lopez Carril without helping his rival Aja.

The next stages did not change the general classification. In the fifteenth stage, the Pyrenées were encountered. There was a crash that took down Galdós, now in sixth place in the general classification, and he had to leave the race.

The Tour was in Spain at that point, and Basque separatist placed bombs on press and team cars. There was violence around France, Andorra and in Corsica from unrelated protests including from farmers and other angry nationalists and in some areas people hung dead pigs from street lamps. The bombings in the Pyrenees took place in the middle of the night in Lourdes where thirteen vacant buses and two parked cars where destroyed. Then a few hours later at Saint-Lary-Soulan several vehicles associated with the Tour de France were targeted and blown up. No one was in them at the time. Leaflets were distributed threatening the fascist government of Spain and telling Spanish riders to leave the race. Other acts of violence against the Tour included many trees being cut down to block the route, which had to be dealt with and removed.

Nobody was hurt, but cyclists were scared: Spanish champion Lopez Carril did not wear his national champion's jersey, afraid to become a target because of the Spanish flag on it.

In the sixteenth stage, with an uphill finish, Poulidor won, his first Tour stage victory since 1965. Merckx finished in fourth place, losing time to Poulidor, Lopez Carril and Pollentier.

In the seventeenth stage, Poulidor again won time, finishing second after Jean-Pierre Danguillaume, and jumped to the third place in the general classification, behind Merckx and Lopez Carril.
Danguillaume also won the eighteenth stage, the last mountain stage. The favourites stayed together with Merckx, and at that point Merckx was more or less certain of the victory, with two time trials remaining, in which he normally would gain time on the others.

Poulidor battled with Lopez-Carril for the second place. After the time trial in the second part of stage 21, Poulidor captured the second place by just one second. Surprisingly, Merckx was in second place in that time trial, beaten by Michel Pollentier. In the last stage, Poulidor increased the margin to Lopez Carril to five seconds due to bonus seconds in an intermediate sprint. At the finish of that last, Sercu finished first in a sprint, but he had blocked the way of Gustaaf Van Roosbroeck, so the jury decided to set him back, and the second rider to finish (Merckx) was declared winner of the stage. Normally, a rider penalized for blocking another rider during a sprint would be set back to the last place of the group that he finished in, but that would have meant that Sercu would have not only lost the stage victory to Merckx, but also the points classification. The jury then declared that only three riders were really sprinting for the stage victory, so Sercu would be set back to the third place; this enabled him to keep his victory in the points classification by 13 points.

Doping
Cyrille Guimard, who had won the first part of stage eight, tested positive for piperidine after stage thirteen. Three other cyclists tested positive:Claude Tollet, for amphetamine; Daniel Ducreux, for piperidine; Carlos Melero, for piperidine.

Classification leadership and minor prizes
There were several classifications in the 1974 Tour de France, three of them awarding jerseys to their leaders. The most important was the general classification, calculated by adding each cyclist's finishing times on each stage. The cyclist with the least accumulated time was the race leader, identified by the yellow jersey; the winner of this classification is considered the winner of the Tour.

Additionally, there was a points classification, where cyclists got points for finishing among the best in a stage finish, or in intermediate sprints. The cyclist with the most points lead the classification, and was identified with a green jersey.

There was also a mountains classification. The organisation had categorised some climbs as either first, second, third, or fourth-category; points for this classification were won by the first cyclists that reached the top of these climbs first, with more points available for the higher-categorised climbs. The cyclist with the most points lead the classification, but was not identified with a jersey in 1974.

Another classification was the combination classification. This classification was calculated as a combination of the other classifications, its leader wore the white jersey.

The fifth individual classification was the intermediate sprints classification. This classification had similar rules as the points classification, but only points were awarded on intermediate sprints. In 1974, this classification had no associated jersey.

For the team classification, the times of the best three cyclists per team on each stage were added; the leading team was the team with the lowest total time. The riders in the team that led this classification were identified by yellow caps. There was also a team points classification. Cyclists received points according to their finishing position on each stage, with the first rider receiving one point. The first three finishers of each team had their points combined, and the team with the fewest points led the classification. The riders of the team leading this classification wore green caps.

In addition, there was a combativity award, in which a jury composed of journalists gave points after certain stages to the cyclist they considered most combative. The split stages each had a combined winner. At the conclusion of the Tour, Eddy Merckx won the overall super-combativity award, also decided by journalists. The Souvenir Henri Desgrange was given to the first rider to pass the memorial to Tour founder Henri Desgrange near the summit of the Col du Galibier on stage 11. This prize was won by Vicente López Carril.

Final standings

General classification

Points classification

Mountains classification

Combination classification

Intermediate sprints classification

Team classification

Team points classification

Aftermath
With his fifth Tour victory, Merckx equalled Jacques Anquetil. Moreover, Merckx had won the first five Tours that he entered. Merckx set a few new records after winning the 1974 Tour:
 Total number of stage victories: 32 (surpassing André Leducq, who had won 25)
 First man to win the Tour de France, Giro d'Italia and Tour de Suisse in one year.

Merckx had already won the 1974 Giro d'Italia earlier that year, and after winning the 1974 Tour de France also won the world championship, and became the first cyclist to win the Triple Crown of Cycling.

Notes

References

Bibliography

External links

 
Tour
Tour
Tour de France by year
Tour de France
Tour de France
1974 Super Prestige Pernod